The 1991 NCAA Skiing Championships were contested at the Park City Mountain Resort in Park City, Utah as the 38th annual NCAA-sanctioned ski tournament to determine the individual and team national champions of men's and women's collegiate slalom and cross-country skiing in the United States.

Colorado, coached by Richard Rokos, claimed their twelfth overall team championship and first as a co-ed team.

Venue

This year's NCAA skiing championships were held at the Park City Mountain Resort in Park City, Utah. 

These were the fourth championships held in the state of Utah (previously 1957, 1963, and 1981).

Program

Men's events
 Cross country, 20 kilometer classical
 Cross country, 10 kilometer freestyle
 Slalom
 Giant slalom

Women's events
 Cross country, 15 kilometer classical
 Cross country, 5 kilometer freestyle
 Slalom
 Giant slalom

Team scoring

 DC – Defending champions

See also
 List of NCAA skiing programs

References

1991 in Utah
NCAA Skiing Championships
NCAA Skiing Championships
1991 in alpine skiing
1991 in cross-country skiing